The 1951 Paris–Tours was the 45th edition of the Paris–Tours cycle race and was held on 7 October 1951. The race started in Paris and finished in Tours. The race was won by Jacques Dupont.

General classification

References

1951 in French sport
1951
1951 Challenge Desgrange-Colombo
October 1951 sports events in Europe